is a Japanese politician. He studied at Todai. He has served as governor of Fukui Prefecture since 2019.

References 

1962 births
Living people
Politicians from Gifu Prefecture
University of Tokyo alumni
Governors of Fukui Prefecture